The 1988–89 Midland Football Combination season was the 52nd in the history of Midland Football Combination, a football competition in England.

Premier Division

The Premier Division featured 15 clubs which competed in the division last season, along with three new clubs:
Chelmsley Town, promoted from Division One
Hinckley, joined from the Central Midlands League
Shirley Town, promoted from Division One

League table

References

1988–89
8